Many of the castles of Jordan, (transliterated) date to Roman times, or were built by the Crusaders in the 12th century. 

There are also many desert castles in Jordan. What is known in English as a "desert castle" is known in Arabic as qaṣr (singular), quṣur being the plural.

List of castles in Jordan

See also
Jordan's desert castles
List of Crusader castles

References

Further reading

Lists of castles in Asia
Lists of castles in the Middle East
Castles
Castles